is a video game character from the Tekken series developed by Namco Bandai Games, first appearing in Tekken 6: Bloodline Rebellion. Created by Dr. Bosconovitch, Alisa is a gynoid with detachable body parts. She and Lars Alexandersson are the main protagonists of the console versions of that game's Scenario Campaign mode. Her surname is commonly misspelled as "Boskonovitch", because her creator's surname is spelled that way. Alisa has received a generally positive reception from fans of the series, proving to be one of the more popular characters introduced in Tekken 6. She has been both praised and criticised for her character design.

Character design
Unlike other new Tekken 6 characters who were based on fan input, both Alisa and Lars were created using a different approach, focusing on their importance to the game's story. Katsuhiro Harada came up with the idea of Alisa having the ability of flying, remove her own head and reveals chainsaws as weaponry. Harada said, "Alisa's quite popular overseas as well. Personally, I didn't think we would get much of a following. We usually do research for new characters, but Alisa was something we created based on internal staff feedback. We really wanted a character with chainsaws on her arms." Scriptwriter Dai Satō then asked, "Influenced by Ash by any chance?" Harada replied, "Exactly.  (laugh)  I'm a huge fan of Sam Raimi's Evil Dead. I just didn't think Alisa would catch on, considering her vast differences from the other characters."

Satō said in 2011 that he had chosen her as one of the two lead characters because he felt Alisa is "the face of the franchise's future". The character was primarily created by Harada as he had ideas for Tekken 6 artists. Satō found Alisa unique within the fighting game genre and wanted to use her. As he discussed the handling of these leads with Harada, Satō claims he wanted to use these characters since they come across as weak, something which he believes films require in order to undergo a character arc, common in coming-of-age story stories. Alisa in particular appealed to him because of how different she made the franchise from other fighting game series. The team worked to provide several elements including action, comedy, drama among others. Sato described it as a "female buddy film" as he wanted to have more characters than just the Mishima conflict from the games. Additionally, the writer wanted it to be accessible. Xiaoyu was written to be relatable to the audience and balance the more supernatural elements in the process. Xiaoyu's relationship with Alisa was made so that the latter develops a "soul" as the film progresses. This surprised her own voice actress not only due to her design but how much of a bigger role she had. Alisa and Xiaoyu were inspired by heroines movies in common in Hollywood.

Satō was fond of non-human characters in fiction and wanted the film to display Alisa's humanity through the story despite thinking Asuka Kazama would be a better protagonist due to the fact she an actual high school student. With Xiaoyu being the audience surrogate, Satō wanted the audience to get attached to Alisa. In the final scenes, the sight of Alisa, bruised and wrecked, summoning her final strength was influenced by Terminator 2 and Alien 2. This scene was storyboarded by Shinji Higuchi much to Satō's joy as it was his favorite. Higuchi was in particular chosen due to his fame with tokusatsu works which felt similar to Alisa's body.

Katsuhiro Harada, described her as "a robot created in the image of Dr. Bosconovitch's daughter."

Gameplay 
Alisa is entirely bionic and amplifies many of her attacks with collapsible jet pack like wings from her back and rockets from her feet she can also extend chainsaws from her lower arms. Her body parts are detachable, they instantly grow back in what appears to be nanoparticle-assisted regeneration. All of her body parts appear to be non-critical, some of her attacking moves involves removing her own head to use as a weapon or even a makeshift explosive device with no ill effects, and arms can be torn off by the opponent or even used as improvised missiles. Alisa uses attacks such as rockets, an explosive head and attacks from her chainsaw appendages. Her fighting style has been listed as simply "Unique".

In the Korean version, Alisa's chainsaws are changed into energy beams reminiscent of lightsabers, and body parts can not be removed. However, all of her moves remain intact such as Alisa's head explosion replace with a small ball.

Appearances

In video games
Alisa Bosconovich was created to protect Jin Kazama and serves him through her travels. Alisa is placed in a starring role in the console-only Scenario Campaign mode in Tekken 6.  After being activated following a botched raid on a Mishima Zaibatsu lab, she joins Lars Alexandersson in his pursuit of his lost memories (which occur as a result of the events at the lab). She is controlled by the CPU in this mode (unless the player chooses to play as Alisa herself, at which point CPU control is given to Lars). Alisa helps Lars (or whoever the player has chosen to use in Scenario Campaign) battle the waves of enemies and has an AI system that grows as she participates in battle. She keeps a journal which she constantly updates with entries regarding the events of her journey with Lars, as well as her own personal opinion about them. It is later revealed that she is actually an android in the employ of Jin, to which she has been serving as a way for Jin to observe what has been happening in the world at large. She is commanded by Jin to disable safe mode (including her personality and behavior inhibition programming) and attack Lars. After a stalemate battle with Lars, she leaves for the desert to join Jin. When Lars arrives, she attacks him again where this time she is ultimately defeated and shuts down. Lars rescues her body and takes her to a robotics corporation (run by Lee Chaolan) where she can be revived. Although the scenario campaign was removed from PlayStation Portable's port, the developers added background information for the character.

In Tekken 7, Alisa has been revived, though suffers memory loss and attacks Lee in self defence upon rebooting. Upon losing, Alisa remembers who Lee is, though questions why she is at Violet systems. Lee then uses his machinery to restore Alisa's memory, which then gives her the desire to find Lars. Before Lee can take her to Lars though, Violet Systems is attacked by the Tekken Force. Lee and Alisa fight them off and flee to another of Lee's facilities, where Lars had been waiting. Alisa happily jumps on Lars in excitement, though the Tekken Force attack again, searching for Jin's body. Alisa assists Lars and Lee in fighting off the Tekken force but Alisa is stopped by Nina Williams who stalls Alisa long enough for a Tekken Force helicopter to capture Jin.  Lee proceeds to blow up his facility, killing countless members of the Tekken force, whilst Alisa flies away happily holding Lars.

Other than the main games of the series, Alisa also appears in the portable game Tekken 3D: Prime Edition as well as the non-canon Tekken Tag Tournament 2, in which her ending (as well as other character's) reinforces her friendship with Ling Xiaoyu first shown in the animated CGI film Tekken: Blood Vengeance. Outside of the Tekken series, she is a playable character in Street Fighter X Tekken as downloadable content, alongside her official tag partner, Lars. She appears as an assist unit in Project X Zone, alongside fellow Tekken characters Jin, Xiaoyu, and a younger Heihachi Mishima. She appears as an unlockable character in the free-to-play game, Tekken Revolution.

Other appearances

Alisa appears as one of the main characters in the 2011 CGI film Tekken: Blood Vengeance. She is a student in the Kyoto International School and befriends Ling Xiaoyu but hides the fact that she is a robot. She acts upon the orders of Jin to find Shin Kamiya along with Xiaoyu under the forced orders of Anna Williams. After Xiaoyu saves her from an ambush attack from Anna, she joins Xiaoyu in finding the truth about the M-cell experiments done on Shin. Throughout the film, she starts to develop a sense of humanity in which she would often hesitate even under her normal protocol commands and her fondness with her friendship with Xiaoyu. During the final battle between Heihachi Mishima and Devil Jin, a severely damaged Alisa sacrifices herself by distracting Heihachi with a blast allowing Jin to defeat him. In the end Jin reverses her standby mode and end credits show her fully restored and discussing how she and Xiaoyu should enter the Tekken tournament. Alisa appears in the Tekken Tag Tournament 2 live-action short film portrayed by Amandine Desprez.

Alisa appears in Tekken Comic, a manga based on Tekken 6. A live-action Alisa, portrayed by Michelle Ballee, also appears in the Tekken Tag Tournament 2 Girl Power Trailer, shown at Comic-Con in 2012. In 2012, Kotobukiya released an Alisa Bosconovitch action figure as part of their Tekken Tag Tournament 2 toyline.

Reception
Randolph Ramsay of GameSpot praised Alisa for her move list the fact that she uses her head as an explosive and attacks from her chainsaw appendages, after stating "Alisa is just sheer fun to play as given her frankly bizarre move list". GameSpot opined that Alisa is the most fun to play as out of all the new characters in Tekken 6, stating "She has a charge-up attack that results in her firing her forearms in a devastating rocket attack. As with all such moves in Tekken, it's generally easy enough to dodge but can be pulled off with some aplomb when you really want to ram home your superiority against a showboating or incompetent opponent--or just someone who elects to play as Eddy or Christie." Ryan Clements of IGN also commented on her move list, calling it "ridiculous", but in a good way, since he enjoyed using her. GameSpy commented that "Alisa's style is wild," but called her getup "completely absurd." 1UP.com commented that Alisa is sexy, cute and has a bubbly personality and stated that she's "the coolest new Tekken character to emerge in years," praising her chainsaws and head bomb. GameZone said she is a good character and commented that her attacks are devastating, stating that "You’ll catch on to her secret whenever her robotic parts creep out and pummel an opponent." Team Xbox declared the move where Alisa removes her head as "one of the most hilarious moves in the franchise's history."

Alisa has also been given comments on her looks. VideoGamer.com called her a "sexed-up cyborg" and thought her rocket projectile attack was coming out of her breasts. They also opined that she seems overpowered at first "but upon closer inspection lacks the essential Tekken tools to ensure long-term usefulness". NZGamer said that she is "as cute as a button" and comments that she has a mismatched wardrobe. Jeff Gerstmann of Giant Bomb commented that for a robot, Alisa is pretty. In a list of "12 match-ups we want to see in Street Fighter X Tekken" article by GamesRadar, they listed a match-up between Alisa and Juri, stating "What do nerds love even more than robots? Hot girls that are robots. Alisa and Juri both fit the bill perfectly". In GamesRadar article for Street Fighter X Tekken, they stated "Though new, the mechanically winged android has become one of the lead stars of the franchise." In 2012, she was listed as one of the most "ridiculous" Tekken characters by Game Informer, who said "Why is a stupid robot fairy in a fighting game? I don't think even Namco Bandai knows the answer to that". In 2013, Complex listed Alisa as the tenth "most badass Russian character in video games", where they observe "Alisa is known to be a real sweetheart once you get to know her." In a 2012 official fan poll held by Bandai Namco, Alisa was the seventh-most requested Tekken character for inclusion in Tekken X Street Fighter, receiving 10,650 (12.09%) of 88,280 votes.

For Tekken: Blood Vengeance, Scott Foy of Dread Central said in his review of the film, "I was constantly laughing at ... those peculiar moments where Ling’s behavior around [Alisa] sure made it seem like she wanted to be much more than just best friends." Capsule Monsters criticized enjoyed early scenes about her search for Shin Kamiya alongside Alisa to be hilarious in an accidental way. Spong was more negative, criticizing her adventure which started Alisa's character arc which came across as fanservice such as one where Xiaoyu is nearly naked in company of her.

Cultural impact
Alisa has been a subject of escapism. Vice writer Aideen O'Flaherty discusses a 22-year-old woman named Zoey, whom suffers from an anxiety disorder mentions that she spends hours playing as Alisa in Tekken 7 to help her "gain confidence, and get a handle on her anxious thoughts and feelings."

See also
List of fictional robots and androids
List of Tekken characters

References

External links

Anthropomorphic video game characters
Female characters in anime and manga
Female characters in video games
Fictional gynoids
Fictional Russian people in video games
Namco protagonists
Robot characters in video games
Tekken characters
Woman soldier and warrior characters in video games
Video game characters introduced in 2008